TBI Limited was an airport owner and operator, incorporated in the United Kingdom in 1972. It was a subsidiary of Airport Concessions and Development Limited (ACDL), owned by Spanish companies Abertis Infraestructuras S.A. (90%) and AENA Desarrollo Internacional S.A. (10%).

History
The company was founded as a property broker named Markheath plc. It was bought out by Thomas Bailey Investments plc. The company changed its name to TBI plc in March, 1994 and to TBI Limited in 2009.

TBI bought Cardiff Airport in 1995, and sold it to the Welsh Government in 2013.

In 2004 the company was acquired by Airport Concessions and Development Limited (ACDL), owned by Spanish companies Abertis Infraestructuras S.A. (90%) and AENA Desarrollo Internacional S.A. (10%).

In 2013, the Bolivian government led by Evo Morales nationalized the airports in Bolivia for which the company owned concessions through its subsidiary Sabsa (the three biggest airports in the country: El Alto International Airport, Jorge Wilstermann International Airport and Viru Viru International Airport).

TBI airports

Sweden
 Stockholm-Skavsta Airport

United Kingdom
 Belfast International Airport
 London Luton Airport

United States
 Orlando Sanford International Airport

Additionally, TBI provides airport management services at Atlanta and Macon, Georgia and Burbank, California in the US.

References

External links
TBI plc

Aviation organisations based in the United Kingdom
Transport operators of the United Kingdom
Airport operators
Companies formerly listed on the London Stock Exchange
1972 establishments in England
Transport companies established in 1972